2034 Bernoulli, provisional designation , is a stony asteroid from the inner regions of the asteroid belt, approximately 9 kilometers in diameter.

The asteroid was discovered on 5 March 1973, by Swiss astronomer Paul Wild at Zimmerwald Observatory near Bern, Switzerland, and named for the members of the Bernoulli family.

Orbit and classification 

Bernoulli orbits the Sun in the inner main-belt at a distance of 1.8–2.7 AU once every 3 years and 4 months (1,230 days). Its orbit has an eccentricity of 0.18 and an inclination of 9° with respect to the ecliptic. The first used precovery was taken at Palomar Observatory in 1951, extending the asteroid's observation arc by 22 years prior to its official discovery, while the first unused observation was made ten years earlier at Uccle Observatory in 1941.

Physical characteristics 

Bernoulli is an assumed, common, stony S-type asteroid.

Rotation period 

A rotational lightcurve of Bernoulli was obtained from photometric observations by Michael Alkema at the U.S. Elephant Head Observatory, Arizona, in December 2012. Lightcurve analysis gave a rotation period of  hours with a brightness variation of 0.21 magnitude.

Diameter and albedo 

According to the survey carried out by the NEOWISE mission of NASA's space-based Wide-field Infrared Survey Explorer, Bernoulli measures 7.8 and 8.5 kilometers in diameter and its surface has an albedo of 0.17 and 0.22, respectively, while the Collaborative Asteroid Lightcurve Link assumes a standard albedo for stony asteroids of 0.20 and calculates a diameter of 9.4 kilometers with an absolute magnitude of 12.5.

Naming 

This minor planet was named in honour of the Bernoulli family, a dynasty of mathematicians from the city of Basel, Switzerland. In particular, Jacob Bernoulli (1654–1705), founder of the calculus of variations, Daniel Bernoulli (1700–1782), co-founder of hydrodynamics, and Johann Bernoulli (1667–1748), contributor to integral calculus and the teacher of Leonhard Euler, after whom the minor planet 2002 Euler is named.

The lunar crater Bernoulli also honors the Swiss dynasty. The official naming citation was published by the Minor Planet Center on 1 June 1980.

References

External links 
 Asteroid Lightcurve Database (LCDB), query form (info )
 Dictionary of Minor Planet Names, Google books
 Asteroids and comets rotation curves, CdR – Observatoire de Genève, Raoul Behrend
 Discovery Circumstances: Numbered Minor Planets (1)-(5000) – Minor Planet Center
 
 

002034
Discoveries by Paul Wild (Swiss astronomer)
Named minor planets
19730305